Buse is a feminine given first name in Turkey, meaning "kiss" in Persian (بوسه) and Turkish, and a surname in other languages, and may refer to:

Given name
 Buse Arıkazan (born 1994), Turkish pole vaulters 
 Buse Güngör (born 1994), Turkish women's footballer
 Buse Tosun (born 1995), Turkish female sport wrestler
 Buse Ünal (born 1997),Turkish volleyball player
 Dilara Buse Günaydın (born 1989), Turkish female swimmer
 Buse Arslan (born 1992), Turkish actress

Surname
 Bertie Buse (1910-1992), English cricketer
 Don Buse
 John Buse
 Matthias Buse, ski jumper
 Mason Buse
 Josh Buse

See also
 Buse Township, Minnesota
 Buse Logging Company, Washington

Turkish feminine given names